The 1921 Virginia gubernatorial election was held on November 8, 1921 to elect the governor of Virginia.

Results

References

1921
Virginia
gubernatorial
November 1921 events